Kalaikkalanjiam (Tamil: Encyclopedia) is a universal encyclopedia in Tamil, published by the Tamil Development Academy, Chennai. The project was funded by the Union Government of India,  the State Government of then Madras Presidency and many Tamil well wishers. The Tamil Development Academy announced its intent to produce this encyclopedia on the day of Indian Independence 15 August 1947. The work started in the academy's Madras University Campus on 20 October 1947. The chief editor of this effort was Periyasaamy Thooran.

Contents 
The first volume was released in 1954 and the tenth and final volume was released in 1968.
 Volume 1 – 1954 – 742 pages
 Volume 2 – 1955 – 760 pages
 Volume 3 – 1956 – 756 pages
 Volume 4 – 1956 – 778 pages
 Volume 5 – 1958 – 750 pages
 Volume 6 – 1959 – 770 pages
 Volume 7 – 1960 – 754 pages
 Volume 8 – 1961 – 758 pages
 Volume 9 – 1963 – 751 pages
 Volume 10 – 1968 – 560 pages

Contributors 

Following groups were involved in producing these volumes:

 Executive groups 5, Total members 74
 Content groups 21, Total members 132
 Research groups 27, Total members 66
 Glossary group 1, Total members 40

In total, 2240 scholars have contributed to various articles in these 10 volumes.

A second revised edition for this encyclopedia was planned with 12 volumes of 1000 pages each. But the plan didn't materialize due to various reasons.

The entire Kalaikkalanjiam is available online at the Tamil Virtual Academy website.

In 2014, Tamil Development Academy donated all 10 volumes under Creative Commons Share-Alike 3.0 license based on Tamil Wikipedia contributors' request. Along with this, 10 volumes of Kuzhandhaigal Kalaikkalanjiam was also released under Creative Commons license.

References

External links 

 Scanned copy of this encyclopedia available in Tamil Virtual University

Tamil language encyclopedias
Indian encyclopedias
1954 non-fiction books
Indian online encyclopedias
20th-century encyclopedias
20th-century Indian books